Dyspessa zurvan is a moth in the family Cossidae. It was described by Yakovlev in 2008. It is found in Iran.

The length of the forewings is 10–11 mm. The forewings are grey brown with a light pattern and suffusion of light scales. The hindwings are brown.

Etymology
The species is named after Zurvan, a Zoroastrian god.

References

Natural History Museum Lepidoptera generic names catalog

Moths described in 2008
Dyspessa
Moths of Asia